Caistor St Edmund is a village and former civil parish on the River Tas, now in the parish of Caistor St Edmund and Bixley, in the South Norfolk district, in Norfolk, England.

History
The remnants of the capital of the Iceni tribe,Venta Icenorum, are located nearly and are now in the care of the Norfolk Archaeological Trust. It is presumed that the 'Stone Street' Roman road runs from Dunwich in Suffolk to Caistor St Edmund.

Caistor St Edmund's name hails back to its Romans origins with 'Caistor' referring to the Old English for a Roman settlement, added to a dedication for the East Anglian King, Saint Edmund.

In the Domesday Book, Caistor St Edmund is recorded as a settlement of 26 households in the hundred of Henstead. The village was divided between Ralph de Beaufour and Bury St Edmunds Abbey.

Caistor Old Hall was built in 1612 for Thomas Pettus, 1st Baronet and remained in the Pettus family until the Nineteenth Century when it passed to the Spurrells of Thurgarton.

On 1 April 2019, the parish was merged with Bixley to form "Caistor St Edmund and Bixley".

St. Edmund's Church
Caistor St. Edmund's Parish Church is of Norman origin and is dedicated to Saint Edmund. Throughout the years, parts of the Roman ruins located around the village have been cannibalised to further extend the church which leaves it with an almost unique character.

Notable Residents
 Boudica- Iceni rebel (possible)

In popular culture
Steve Coogan's comedy character, Alan Partridge was married in St. Edmund's Church.

War Memorial
Caistor St Edmund's War Memorial is located in St. Edmund's Churchyard and was unveiled in 1922 by Reverend John Warren. It lists the following names for the First World War:
 Second-Lieutenant Richard La Fontaine Whittall (1893-1915), Headquarters, 52nd (Lowland) Infantry Division
 Cadet J. Derek Corbould-Warren (d.1917), Royal Military College, Sandhurst
 Corporal George Franklin (1885-1914), 1st Battalion, Royal Norfolk Regiment
 Lance-Corporal Arthur C. Fuller (1883-1915), Military Foot Police
 Private William Leech (1894-1917), 4th Battalion, Royal Norfolk Regiment
 Private Walter Ellis (1894-1917), 5th Battalion, Royal Norfolk Regiment
 Rifleman Charles E. Back (1897-1917), 21st Battalion, King's Royal Rifle Corps
 Rifleman Walter W. J. Blake (1898-1918), 3rd Battalion, Rifle Brigade (The Prince Consort's Own)

And, the following for the Second World War:
 Sergeant Cedric R. Minns (1921-1943), No. 218 (Gold Coast) Squadron RAF

References

External links

Defra walk around the site
Norfolk Archaeological Trust
South Norfolk Council
Caistor St Edmund Parish Council
Online tour -->

Villages in Norfolk
Former civil parishes in Norfolk
South Norfolk